Borhane Abro, (born 1995) is a Djiboutian swimmer.

Competitions
He competed in the 50, 100 m freestyle, 50 m butterfly and 100 m butterfly events at the 2012 FINA World Swimming Championships (25 m). 

Borhane also took part in the 50 m freestyle, and 50 m butterfly events at the 2013 World Aquatics Championships.

References

Living people
1995 births
Djiboutian male swimmers